Ken Maynard (born Albury, New South Wales in 1928  died 29 September 1998 Gold Coast, Queensland) was an Australian cartoonist.

Maynard had an older sister, Florence, and a younger brother, Thomas.

Originally a police officer, Maynard got his break as a cartoonist in 1958 contributing his Ettamogah Pub cartoons to the Australasian Post. They became a main feature of the magazine and his cartoons were run until its last edition.

These cartoons were the inspiration for a chain of Ettamogah Pubs throughout Australia. There are Ettamogah Pubs in Sydney, Albury-Wodonga, and Cunderdin.

Maynard died on 29 September 1998 due to liver cancer.

References
 Around the Ettamogah pub. Book no. 1 / by Ken Maynard (1972)
 Ettamogah pub mob / Ken Maynard (1985)
 The great Australian sandwich / Tony Johnston, cartoons by Ken Maynard & WEG (1991?)
 Ken Maynard cartoons: a nostalgic look back on Ken's cartoons as appearing in 'Australasian post' (1978)
 Ken Maynard cartoons 101 to 164: a collection of "Ned & his Neddy" as appearing in "Australasian Post" / Ken Maynard (1978)
 The mob from Ettamogah Pub, or, Ned and his Neddy / Ken Maynard (197?)
 The pub & the scrub / Neil Hulm with illustrations by Ken Maynard (1987)

External links
 Australasian Post Info

1928 births
1998 deaths
People from Albury, New South Wales
Australian cartoonists
Deaths from liver cancer
Deaths from cancer in Queensland